Eva Jinek (born 13 July 1978) is a Dutch American journalist and television presenter.

Biography
Jinek was born in Tulsa, Oklahoma and grew up in Washington, D.C., where she attended Sheridan School. Her family is of Czech descent. Her family decided to move to the Netherlands when she was eleven. Jinek recounts that "before I went to high school, they decided that they would prefer that my brother and I grow up in Europe. I remember it was six weeks until I spoke my first word in Dutch."

After studying American history at the University of Leiden in 2004, she became foreign editor of the Dutch public news network NOS Journaal, where she covered the United States. In addition, since the end of 2007 she anchored the news show NOS Journaal 3. Since the autumn of 2008, Jinek presented the morning and afternoon news bulletins of the NOS. In May of that year she joined with fellow editor Monique van Hoogstraten, the editor of "Het maakbare nieuws," a collection of eighteen stories with foreign journalists, provided in response to the book "Het zijn net mensen" (Almost Human) of journalist-writer Joris Luyendijk.

She is well known for her coverage of the USA, since her work as a co-host of the show 'Amerika Kiest' (America Votes) of the NOS on the U.S. presidential elections, seen from the Netherlands on November 4 and 5th, 2008. Together with Philip Freriks she reported directly from the Occidental Restaurant near the White House. About the preparation of Amerika Kiest, Jinek told TV guide Mikro Gids: "The last weeks before the broadcast Amerika Kiest totally dominated my life, at the end, even 24 hours a day. I was so nervous. It felt like all eyes were on me. I just thought: Oh my god, let me do well. Really well!"

On January 20, 2009, she was the host of the live broadcast on Nederland 1 of the inauguration of Barack Obama as 44th President of the United States.

In early 2010, Jinek was announced as one of the main presenters of the new news show Nieuwsuur (News Hour), alternating with anchor Twan Huys, but her relationship with former criminal defense lawyer Bram Moszkowicz sparked controversy about a conflict of interest, as Moszkowicz often appeared in the news; as a result, Jinek agreed to step down.

She debuted as a radio host on June 4, 2010, for the program  (A Glance at Tomorrow), She hosted the show every Monday night until 2014. On August 28, 2011 Jinek presented her last 6pm bulletin for the NOS.

In 2015 Jinek got her own late night talk show, "Jinek", at 23:00 at the KRO-NCRV. Jinek stayed on as the presenter of her show during her pregnancy in 2018. She took her maternity leave a week earlier than planned. In 2018 she gave birth to a son, Pax. 

Since 2020, Jinek has moved from KRO-NCRV to RTL4. At this commercial tv-station, the talkshowhost alternates with Beau van Erven Dorens with her late night talkshow with the same name.

References

External links

1978 births
Living people
American television news anchors
American television talk show hosts
American radio personalities
American people of Czech descent
American emigrants to the Netherlands
Dutch television journalists
Dutch television presenters
Dutch television news presenters
Dutch television talk show hosts
Dutch reporters and correspondents
Dutch radio presenters
Dutch women radio presenters
Dutch people of Czech descent
Leiden University alumni
Television personalities from Tulsa, Oklahoma
American women television journalists
Dutch women television presenters
American women television presenters
Dutch women journalists